"I'm a Lover (Not a Fighter)" is a song written by Ronny Light and recorded and released as a single in 1969 by American country artist, Skeeter Davis. A song by the same title was also written by Jay Miller much earlier in 1958 which The Kinks covered on their 1964 debut album.

The song was recorded at the RCA Victor Studio in Nashville, Tennessee, United States on October 1, 1969. The session was produced by Ronny Light as well. The song was released as a single in November 1969, reaching the top-ten on the Billboard Magazine Hot Country Singles chart in 1970. Additionally, it became Davis' second single to chart on the Canadian RPM Country Songs chart. “I'm a Lover (Not a Fighter)” reached #7. The song was her first top 10 country hit in Canada. In 1970, the song was issued onto her studio album A Place in the Country.

Chart performance

References 

1969 songs
Skeeter Davis songs
1969 singles
RCA Victor singles
Songs written by Ronny Light